Anaemosia is a genus of moths in the subfamily Arctiinae. It contains the single species Anaemosia albida, which is found in Malawi.

References

Natural History Museum Lepidoptera generic names catalog

Endemic fauna of Malawi
Lithosiini
Lepidoptera of Malawi
Moths of Sub-Saharan Africa
Monotypic moth genera